The City of Cranbourne was a local government area about  southeast of Melbourne, the state capital of Victoria, Australia. It was notable for being the last local government area to be declared a city prior to the large-scale amalgamations of 1994 – its former designation was the Shire of Cranbourne.

History

The Cranbourne Road District was first incorporated on 19 June 1860, and became a shire on 6 March 1868. On 27 January 1893, it annexed part of the Shire of Buln Buln, around the areas of Koo Wee Rup and Lang Lang, while on 6 May 1919, it lost some of its territory to the Shires of Frankston and Hastings. From the 1950s onwards, industrial development started to spread southwards from Dandenong, and by the 1980s, Cranbourne was part of Melbourne's southeastern growth corridor and had essentially become a dormitory suburb of Dandenong and Melbourne. However, eastern parts of the shire were still rural in character, with dairying, market gardening, potato growing and animal breeding being primary pursuits.

On 22 April 1994, Cranbourne was proclaimed a city by the Governor of Victoria, Richard McGarvie. However, less than eight months later, on 15 December 1994, the City of Cranbourne was abolished, and split into six portions of varying sizes. The largest sections were given to the City of Casey, which received Cranbourne itself, as well as Hampton Park and the rural/semi-rural areas of Devon Meadows, Clyde and a number of coastal villages, including Tooradin. The City of Frankston received Langwarrin, Carrum Downs and Skye, with other smaller transfers included:

 Dandenong South and parts of Lyndhurst to the City of Greater Dandenong;
 Koo Wee Rup and Lang Lang to the Shire of Cardinia and Bass Coast Shire;
 Part of Pearcedale to the Shire of Mornington Peninsula.

An article in The Age in July 1994 reported that Cranbourne was "losing the fight to remain separate". During the submission process, the council had wanted to remain as is with no merger or loss of territory, as it was fast-growing and needed its entire rate base. In its final year of existence, Cranbourne was one of the five fastest growing municipalities in Australia, in marked contrast to most of the rest of the state.

Council met at Shire Offices in Sladen Street, Cranbourne, which were a purpose-built facility opening in 1978. The building was sold by Casey City Council in 1995, and is now used as a health care facility, known as the 'Cranbourne Integrated Care Centre'. Prior to 1978, the Shire of Cranbourne met at the 'Old Shire Offices', which is next to the buildings built in 1978. This building is now used as a venue for council meetings by the City of Casey, as well as hosting many historical artefacts of the former shire.

Wards

The Shire of Cranbourne was divided into four ridings, each of which elected three councillors. On becoming a city, the ridings became wards.
 North Riding
 East Riding
 Centre Riding
 West Riding

Suburbs and localities
Outer Metropolitan:
 Botanic Ridge*
 Carrum Downs (shared with the City of Springvale)
 Clyde
 Clyde North
 Cranbourne+
 Cranbourne East*
 Cranbourne North
 Cranbourne South
 Cranbourne West*
 Dandenong South (shared with the City of Dandenong)
 Devon Meadows
 Hampton Park
 Junction Village
 Langwarrin
 Lynbrook*
 Lyndhurst
 Skye

* Suburbs gazetted since the amalgamation.
+ Council seat.

Rural:
 Baxter (shared with the City of Frankston and Shire of Hastings)
 Bayles
 Blind Bight
 Caldermeade
 Cannons Creek
 Cardinia
 Catani
 Dalmore
 Heath Hill
 Koo Wee Rup
 Lang Lang
 Monomeith
 Pearcedale (shared with the City of Frankston and Shire of Hastings)
 Tooradin
 Warneet
 Yannathan

Population

* Estimate in the 1958 Victorian Year Book.

References

External links
 Victorian Places - Cranbourne Shire

Cranbourne
City of Casey
City of Frankston
1860 establishments in Australia
1994 disestablishments in Australia
City of Greater Dandenong
Shire of Cardinia